George Rolland House II (November 20, 1929 – July 14, 2016) was a Republican Assemblymember from California's 25th State Assembly district from 1994 until he was term limited in 2000.

Pre-Assembly career
Prior to serving in the Assembly, House was an almond farmer from Hughson, CA. He served two years with the Modesto, CA police department before becoming a CHP officer and commander for thirty years. He was also a Stanislaus County Juvenile Traffic Court hearing officer. He also served on the Hughson school board and was an active Rotarian.

1992 election
House ran for the newly created 25th Assembly district in 1992; however, he lost the primary to Barbara Keating-Edh who ended up losing to Margaret Snyder.  He came in 4th place with just eleven percent of the vote.

1994 election
House ran for Assembly again in 1994.  Although initially considered a weak candidate, he  defeated Democratic incumbent Margaret Snyder in a heavily Republican year that saw the GOP take control of the California State Assembly for the first time since 1970.

The 25th District
When House represented the seat from 1994 until 2000, it included half of Stanislaus County, all of Mariposa County and Tuolumne County. It also included most of Madera County and a small part of Fresno County.

Proposition 34
House was a major opponent of Proposition 34 in 2000 which stated that 34% of the total annual state lottery revenues shall be allocated to benefit public education. However, it passed with 53% of the vote.

2002 Congressional Election
House put a bid in for California's 18th Congressional District in 2002 in order to face troubled incumbent Gary Condit; however, he withdrew from the race prior to the election and still received 12.8% of the vote in the primary against then State Senator Dick Monteith who now serves as a Stanislaus County supervisor.

Electoral history

References

2. Lavender-Smith, Sarah. "House Calls 'Em as He Sees 'Em", Modesto Bee, 12 December 1994, Page A-1

2016 deaths
Republican Party members of the California State Assembly
1929 births